The Royal Victoria Dock Bridge is a signature high-level footbridge crossing the Royal Victoria Dock in the Docklands area of east London designed by London-based architects and designers Lifschutz Davidson Sandilands. The bridge provides a direct link from Eastern Quay and Britannia Village, a residential development to the south of the dock, to the ExCeL Exhibition Centre and Custom House station, both situated to the north of the dock.

The bridge takes the form of an inverted Fink truss, with six masts rising above the deck at  centres, varying in height from almost  at each end to just  for the smallest masts. The shape of the bridge is designed to reflect the masts of the sailing boats which use the dock. The bridge is accessed at each end by lift and stair towers.

The bridge was completed in 1998, at a cost of £5 million.
A second construction stage envisaged in the bridge's design involves the addition of a glass passenger cabin travelling on a rail of the underside of the deck to make this a transporter bridge.

Gallery

See also
List of bridges in London

References

External links
Royal Victoria Dock Bridge

Pedestrian bridges in London
Buildings and structures in the London Borough of Newham
Bridges completed in 1998
1998 establishments in England
Silvertown
Canning Town